Holy Trinity Catholic School is a coeducational secondary school located in the Small Heath area of Birmingham, in the West Midlands of England.

The school is named after the Trinity, the Christian doctrine that defines God as the Father, the Son, and the Holy Spirit. As a Catholic school it is under the jurisdiction of Roman Catholic Archdiocese of Birmingham.

Previously a voluntary aided school administered by Birmingham City Council, in May 2019 Holy Trinity Catholic School converted to academy status. The school is now sponsored by the St Teresa of Calcutta Multi-Academy Company.

Holy Trinity Catholic School offers GCSEs and BTECs as programmes of study for pupils.

References

External links
Holy Trinity Catholic School official website

Secondary schools in Birmingham, West Midlands
Academies in Birmingham, West Midlands
Catholic secondary schools in the Archdiocese of Birmingham